The Woman's Club of Winter Haven (also known as the Women's Civic League of Winter Haven and Vicinity Clubhouse) is a historic woman's club in Winter Haven, Florida. It is located at 660 Pope Avenue, Northwest. On August 10, 1998, it was added to the U.S. National Register of Historic Places. Since 2006, it has served as the headquarters of the Museum of Winter Haven History.

See also
List of Registered Historic Woman's Clubhouses in Florida

Gallery

References

External links
 Polk County listings at National Register of Historic Places
 Woman's Club of Winter Haven at Florida's Office of Cultural and Historical Programs

National Register of Historic Places in Polk County, Florida
Buildings and structures in Winter Haven, Florida
Women's clubs in Florida
Women's club buildings in Florida